Luhrsen Nunatak is a nunatak  south-southeast of Mount Alford at the southeast end of the Helliwell Hills, Antarctica. It was mapped by the United States Geological Survey from surveys and U.S. Navy air photos, 1960–63, and was named by the Advisory Committee on Antarctic Names for Richard H. Luhrsen, assistant to the United States Antarctic Research Program representative at McMurdo Station, 1967–68.

References

Nunataks of Victoria Land
Pennell Coast